The Great Eight Families were eight noble families of Baekje, one of the Three Kingdoms of Korea. They were the most powerful of the noble families and had been comrades in arms with the founding monarch Onjo of Baekje. They reached the pinnacle of their power during the Sabi, recorded in Chinese records such as Tongdian.

The Hae clan and the Jin clan were the representative royal houses who had considerable power from the early period of Baekje, and they produced many queens over several generations. The Hae clan was probably the royal house before the Buyeo clan replaced them, and both clans appear descended from the lineage of Buyeo and Goguryeo.

History
After the Battle at Mt. Amak fortress against Silla during the beginning of the reign of King Mu of Baekje the Great Eight Families lost a great deal of power. Among the families the Hae clan (who had led the battle), Hyeop, Jin and Mok disappeared from the central political stage leaving only the Yeon, Guk and Baek clans. The Sa clan promoted their influence by military force and produced a queen in the late reign of Mu of Baekje.

They did not lose their status as central nobles during the reign of the last King, Uija of Baekje by colluding with royal authority. The royal family (Buyeo clan) acquired influence with the collapse of the Great Eight Families. After King Uija acceded the throne, royal might was also divided and the lineal descendant of the royal clan with the king as its center was in control of political situation. Among the Great Eight Families, Yeon and Baek clans fell behind and only clans of Sa and Guk maintained their status as central nobles. In the late Baekje all the Great Eight Families except for Sa and Guk clans lost their status as the central nobles and were degraded to local influence at last.

Families
 Jin clan – produced queens of Baekje.
 Hae clan – produced queens of Baekje.
 Mok clan
 Baek clan
 Guk clan
 Hyeop clan
 Yeon clan
 Sa clan

Notes

References
 Hong, Wontack. (1994). Paekche of Korea and the Origin of Yamato Japan. Seoul: Kudara International.

See also
History of Korea
Three Kingdoms of Korea

477 deaths
Baekje people
Year of birth unknown